Bhojva is a village in Viramgam taluka, Ahmedabad district, Gujarat, India.

History
Before 1947, Bhojva was under Patdi State.

Demographics
Total population is 4283 and there are 886 houses in the village as per census of India 2011.

Amenities
There are two government schools, Bhojva Model School and the Bhojva Primary School. There are two mosques and five Hindu temples.

References

Villages in Ahmedabad district
Settlements in Gujarat